Ludovico da l'Armi (fl. 1544) was an assassin hired by Henry VIII of England to kill the King's cousin and critic, Cardinal Pole. Da l'Armi was an Italian mercenary and the nephew of Cardinal Campeggio.

References

Year of birth missing
Year of death missing
People of the Tudor period
16th-century Italian people
Henry VIII